The 2012–13 Vijay Hazare Trophy was the eleventh season of the Vijay Hazare Trophy, a List A cricket tournament in India. It was contested between 27 domestic cricket teams, starting in February and finishing in March 2013. In the final, Delhi beat Assam by 75 runs to win their maiden title.

Group Matches
Central Zone

  Madhya Pradesh and Uttar Pradesh qualified for the knockout stage.

East Zone

  Assam and Bengal qualified for the knockout stage.

North Zone

  Punjab and Delhi qualified for the knockout stage.

South Zone

  Karnataka and Kerala qualified for the knockout stage.

West Zone

  Gujarat and Mumbai qualified for the knockout stage.

Knockout Matches
Preliminary Quarterfinal 1

Preliminary Quarterfinal 2

Quarterfinal 1

Quarterfinal 2

Quarterfinal 3

Quarterfinal 4

Semifinal 1

Semifinal 2

Final

References

External links
 Series home at ESPN Cricinfo

Vijay Hazare Trophy
Vijay Hazare Trophy